Dodecanal, also known as lauraldehyde or dodecyl aldehyde, is an organic compound with the chemical formula CH3(CH2)10CHO. This colourless liquid is a component of many fragrances.  It occurs naturally in citrus oils, but commercial samples are usually produced from dodecanol by dehydrogenation.

References

Fatty aldehydes
Alkanals